Pyotr "Petr" Vasilievich Schastlivy (born April 18, 1979) is a Russian professional ice hockey player, who is currently a free agent having last played for HSC Csíkszereda. He played a total of 129 games in the National Hockey League (NHL) with the Ottawa Senators and Mighty Ducks of Anaheim, as well as several minor league professional teams.

He is married to the Latvian long jumper Ineta Radēviča.

Playing career 
Schastlivy was the 4th round pick (101st overall) of the Ottawa Senators in the 1998 NHL Entry Draft. Schastlivy played one season with Torpedo Yaroslavl of the Russian League before coming to North America for the 1999–00 season. Schastlivy began the season with the Grand Rapids Griffins of the IHL, though was called up to the Senators, where he played 13 games and his only playoff game to date.

He spent the 2000–01 and 2001–02 seasons playing with both the Senators and Griffins, before being traded to the Mighty Ducks of Anaheim in February 2004, in exchange for Todd Simpson. He played 22 more games for the Mighty Ducks at the end of the 2003–04 season, before returning to Russia to continue to play hockey. Since leaving the NHL, he has played with Lokomotiv Yaroslavl, Khimik Moscow Oblast, CSKA Moscow, Salavat Yulaev Ufa, Torpedo Nizhny Novgorod, Dinamo Riga and HC Sochi of the Kontinental Hockey League.

Career statistics

Regular season and playoffs

International

External links 

1979 births
Living people
Grand Rapids Griffins players
Atlant Moscow Oblast players
HC CSKA Moscow players
Dinamo Riga players
HC Sarov players
HSC Csíkszereda players
Lokomotiv Yaroslavl players
Metallurg Novokuznetsk players
Mighty Ducks of Anaheim players
Ottawa Senators draft picks
Ottawa Senators players
People from Irkutsk Oblast
Russian ice hockey left wingers
Salavat Yulaev Ufa players
HC Sochi players
Torpedo Nizhny Novgorod players
Yermak Angarsk players
Sportspeople from Irkutsk Oblast
Russian expatriate ice hockey people
Russian expatriate sportspeople in the United States
Expatriate ice hockey players in Canada
Russian expatriate sportspeople in Canada
Expatriate ice hockey players in the United States
Expatriate ice hockey players in Romania
Russian expatriate sportspeople in Romania
Russian expatriate sportspeople in Latvia
Expatriate ice hockey players in Latvia